"Just Take My Heart" is the fourth and final single from American rock band Mr. Big's second studio album, Lean into It (1991). Released in 1992, it reached number 16 on the US Billboard Hot 100 and number 26 on the UK Singles Chart. It also reached the top 20 in Canada, Finland, Ireland, the Netherlands, and Switzerland.

Personnel
 Eric Martin – lead vocals
 Paul Gilbert – guitar, backing vocals
 Billy Sheehan – six-string bass, backing vocals
 Pat Torpey – drums, percussion

Charts

Weekly charts

Year-end charts

References

1991 songs
1992 singles
Atlantic Records singles
Mr. Big (American band) songs
Songs written by Andre Pessis